Glycymeris longior is a species of mollusc of the genus Glycymeris.

Range 
This species is found in the Atlantic Ocean, in the southwestern coast of South America, from the state of Espirito Santo, Brazil to the San Matías Gulf in Argentina, with some studies suggesting it might be found up to the northern state of Pará, in Brazil.

Habitat 
Glycymeris longior is found buried in or just above sandy soils in shallow waters, up to 10 meters deep.

References 

longior
Bivalves described in 1833